Mammoth Cave Baptist Church and Cemetery is a historic church in Mammoth Cave National Park in Kentucky. It was built in 1827 and added to the National Register of Historic Places in 1991.

The church was established in 1827.  The current building was built in 1927 after the original was destroyed in a tornado.  It is a  one-story gable-front frame building, on a foundation of stacked sandstone blocks.

Notable burials
 Floyd Collins (1887–1925), cave explorer and famous cave accident victim

See also 
 Good Spring Baptist Church and Cemetery: also in Mammoth Cave National Park
 Joppa Baptist Church and Cemetery: also in Mammoth Cave National Park
 National Register of Historic Places listings in Edmonson County, Kentucky
 National Register of Historic Places listings in Mammoth Cave National Park

References

External links
 
 
 

Cemeteries on the National Register of Historic Places in Kentucky
Baptist cemeteries in the United States
Baptist churches in Kentucky
Churches on the National Register of Historic Places in Kentucky
Churches in Edmonson County, Kentucky
Historic districts on the National Register of Historic Places in Kentucky
National Register of Historic Places in Edmonson County, Kentucky
National Register of Historic Places in Mammoth Cave National Park
1927 establishments in Kentucky
Churches completed in 1927